Trosterud is a station on Furusetbanen (line 2) in the Alna borough between Haugerud and Lindeberg, 8.4 km from Stortinget. The station is located overground, but is inside the Trosterud shopping centre, and not an open-air station. It is located in a largely residential area with several apartment buildings.

The station was opened on 15 December 1974 and was the end station until 19 February 1978. Formerly, Trosterud was one of the more blighted and unattractive stations in the east. Renovation of the station by adding artwork to the station area was completed 23 October 2004. The artistic work was partly done by the Trosterud youth club, led by artist Adriana Bertet, who also participated in the decoration of the station at Stovner.

References

List of eastern T-bane stations
Renovation of Trosterud (Norwegian article)

External links

Oslo Metro stations in Oslo
Railway stations opened in 1974
1974 establishments in Norway